The Roddick Gates, also known as the Roddick Memorial Gates, are monumental gates in Montreal that serve as the main entrance to the McGill University downtown campus. They are located on Sherbrooke Street West and are at the northern end of the very short but broad McGill College Avenue, which starts at Place Ville-Marie.

History  

In 1924, Amy Redpath Roddick donated the Roddick Gates in memory of her late husband, Sir Thomas George Roddick, a renowned doctor and dean of the Faculty of Medicine from 1901 to 1908. Amy Redpath Roddick (May 16, 1868 - February 16, 1954) was the first-born child and only daughter of Ada Mills and John James Redpath. She became the second wife of Thomas Roddick on September 3, 1906. 

Amy Redpath Roddick commissioned Grattan D. Thompson (1895-1971) to carry out the work on the monument. In 1922, Gratton D. Thompson married Elizabeth Grace Redpath. 

The Roddick Gates were formally opened by Amy Redpath Roddick on May 28, 1925. The four clocks and Westminster Quarters Strike were made by Seth Thomas and the four bells by Meneely Bell Foundry. In 2010 the clocks were repaired by Electric Time Company and rededicated. 
Two other significant buildings at McGill University bear the family name: the Redpath Library and the Redpath Museum. 

In Harbour Grace, Newfoundland and Labrador, where Thomas Roddick was born, there is a Roddick fountain.

Notes

Buildings and structures completed in 1925 
History of Montreal 
McGill University buildings
Monuments and memorials in Montreal
Gates in Canada
1925 in Canada